Seydim is a village in the Çorum District of Çorum Province in Turkey. Its population is 547 (2022). Before the 2013 reorganisation, it was a town (belde).

References

Villages in Çorum District